The following is a chronicle of events during the year 1976 in ice hockey.

Olympics
The men's tournament  at the 1976 Winter Olympics in Innsbruck, Austria, was the 13th Olympic Championship. The Soviet Union won its fifth gold medal. Czechoslovakia gained the silver, while West Germany obtained the bronze medal. Games were held at the Olympiahalle Innsbruck. Vladimir Shadrin was the scoring champion with 14 points.

National Hockey League
Art Ross Trophy as the NHL's leading scorer during the regular season: Guy Lafleur
Hart Memorial Trophy: for the NHL's Most Valuable Player: Bobby Clarke
Stanley Cup - Montreal Canadiens defeat the Philadelphia Flyers in the 1976 Stanley Cup Finals. Reggie Leach of the Flyers captured the Conn Smythe Trophy.
With the first overall pick in the 1976 NHL Amateur Draft, the Washington Capitals selected Rick Green

European hockey

Minor League hockey
American Hockey League: The Nova Scotia Voyageurs won the Calder Cup 
IHL: Dayton Gems won the Turner Cup.  
United Hockey League:   Colonial Cup.
Southern Hockey League: The Charlotte Checkers won the James Crockett Cup

Junior A hockey

University hockey
 The Minnesota Golden Gophers men's ice hockey team, led by head coach Herb Brooks,  won the NCAA Division I Men's Ice Hockey Tournament

Women's hockey
The Bishops University Gaiters women's ice hockey team hosted a Women's Invitational Hockey Tournament. The participants also included John Abbott College, University of New Brunswick Red Blazers and Dawson College. John Abbott captured the championship, while Bishop's defeated Dawson College in double overtime for third place.

Deaths

Season articles

See also
1976 in sports

References